The Maronite Catholic Eparchy of Saint Maron of Sydney (in Latin: Eparchia Sancti Maronis Sydneyensis Maronitarum) (sometimes spelt Maroun) is an overseas Maronite rite (Antiochene rite) eparchy (diocese) of the Catholic Church in Australia, based in Sydney. In 2010 there were 160,000 members. It is currently ruled by Eparch Antoine-Charbel Tarabay, OLM.

Territory and statistics
It is a member of the Australian Catholic Bishops Conference. The Roman Catholic Church is made up of the Latin or Western Catholic Church and 23 Eastern Catholic Churches (comprising four major rites), one of which is the Lebanese Maronite Church. The Eparchy is non-geographic, but demographic in that it has Australia-wide jurisdiction wherever Maronites are found. It is not suffragan to the Archdiocese of Sydney, but immediately subject to the Holy See. It has many churches, schools, nursing homes and other institutions in all major cities. Its eparchial seat is in Redfern, New South Wales, a suburb of Sydney, where is located the St. Maron's Cathedral, Sydney. In 2010 there were 160,000 Lebanese Maronite Catholics in 11 parishes, the largest of which is at Our Lady of Lebanon Co-Cathedral in Harris Park, New South Wales.

History

19th Century
Due to a large emigration of Lebanese Maronite Christians in mid to late 19th century, Maronite Patriarch in 1889 decided that pastoral ministry among the Lebanese Christians in Sydney will be established. In this regard, the Maronite priests Abdallah Yazbeck and Joseph Dahdah were to work for the Diaspora's community in Sydney and reached on 8 May 1893 the Sydney's port. They set up in 1894 a Maronite chapel in the Waterloo district and served until 1897, when a new church was inaugurated by the then Cardinal Moran on January 10, 1897, for the service of the Maronites. Pastor Abdallah Yazbeck died in 1933 in Sydney, and priest Joseph Dahdah died after his return to Lebanon in 1936.

Twentieth century
Priest Abdallah Assaf was the successor and was the Maronite pastor until 1960. Assaf was replaced by Chukrallah Harb in 1961 until his return in 1963 to the Vatican City. In the district of Redfern's Saint Maron Church served all Maronite Catholics for 70 years until the Maronites of the community settled in other centers as Parramatta. The community continued to grow at remarkable. The Maronite Patriarch named Reverend Peter Ziade to continue the Priest Harb's pastoral ministry in 1963. He was assisted by Priest Trad. From 1963 to 1965, the church of Saint Maron was built. In addition, a town hall, municipal school, a rectory in the district of Redfern was built also in 1965. The Congregation of the Maronite Sisters of the Holy Family established their missionary work in 1968. A piece of land of Harris Park in Sydney with a community hall was built and the foundation stone for the Church of Our Lady of Lebanon was laid in 1970. Pastor Ziade helped to establish a Lebanese monastic order in Sydney and participated in the founding of the diocese in Australia.

The eparchy was erected on 25 June 1973 by Pope Paul VI's bull Illo fretis Councils. and in October 1973 Archbishop (pro hac vice) Ignace Abdo Khalifé in Rome was established as Eparchy of the newly Maronite Catholic Eparchy of Saint Maron in Sydney. His duties were also the organization and establishment of additional Maronite eparchies in Australia and request help from other priests. The first priests who had answered the bishop's ask for help were Michal Boumelhem, Youseff Touma, Antoun Shalhoub and Nakhle Akiki. During their joint, 18-year pastoral ministry for the Maronite Eparchy of Saint Maron in Sydney the Maronite Catholic Church of the Lady of Lebanon was opened in 1978. After that, Eparch Khalife built the Church of the Saint Joseph in the district of Croydon and the Saint George in Thornleigh. This was followed by the acquisition of land for the bishopric in Strathfield district and the establishment of Antonine Sisters in Melbourne in 1981. In addition to the establishment of the Home of Our Lady of Lebanon, in Harris Park, Eparch Khalifé ordered the acquisition of land for the construction of the Our Lady of Lebanon Church in Wollongong, New South Wales. It also followed the acquisition of land for the construction of two houses near the church of Our Lady in Harris Park. Eparch Khalife ended his mission in 1991 and was replaced by Eparch Joseph Hitti.

Bishop Hitti took over the diocese on 4 March 1991. Under his leadership, the Maronite community continues to grow. In 1993, the Congregation of Maronite Missionaries welcomed by parish priest Sarkis Charbel founded then their pastoral mission in Sydney. The kindergarten facility in Belmore was inaugurated. The authorization for the acquisition of land for the establishment of a parent company for the Maronite nuns in Dulwich Hill has been permitted. Under Bishop Hitti, the Lebanese Our Lady of Lebanon University and the Saint Charbel high school were inaugurated. The Antonius monks were invited to Melbourne to begin their missionary work among the Maronite faithful. They accepted the invitation and came to Australia in December 1997. The inauguration of the newly established Secretariat in Strathfield was blessed by Bishop Hitti.

Bishop Ad Abi Karam was formally installed in office on 8 February 2002. He was the third Maronite Bishop of Australia.

On 17 April 2013 Eparch Anthony Tarabay replaced Karam and became the fourth Eparch of the Maronites in Australia.

Parishes
The Maronite Eparchy has 14 parishes across Australia, with churches in New South Wales, Victoria, Queensland, South Australia and Western Australia.

New South Wales
St Maroun's Cathedral (Redfern)
Our Lady of Lebanon Co-Cathedral (Harris Park)
St George's Church	(Thornleigh)
St Joseph's Church	(Croydon)
St Charbel's Church (Punchbowl)
St John the Beloved Church	(Mount Druitt)
St Raymond's Church (Auburn South)
St Rafqa's Church (Austral)
Christ the Redeemer Maronite Catholic Parish (Dural)
Our Lady of Lebanon (Wollongong)

Victoria
Our Lady of Lebanon Church	(Thornbury)
South Australia
St Maroun's Church	(Westbourne Park)
Queensland
St Maroun's Church (Greenslopes)
Western Australia
St Charbel's Church (Perth)

Episcopal ordinaries
The following individuals have been elected as Maronite Eparch of Saint Maron:
{| class="wikitable"
!Order
!Name
!Title
!Date enthroned
!Reign ended
!Term of office
!Reason for term end
|-
|align="center"| ||Ignace Abdo Khalifé, S.J. † ||Archbishop-bishop of St Maron of Sydney (Maronite) ||align="center" |25 June 1973 ||align="center" |23 November 1990 ||align="right" | ||Retired and appointed Bishop Emeritus of St Maroun of Sydney
|-
|align="center"| ||Joseph Hitti †  ||Bishop of St Maron of Sydney (Maronite) ||align="center" |23 November 1990 ||align="center" |26 October 2001 ||align="right" | ||Retired and appointed Bishop Emeritus of St Maroun of Sydney
|-
|align="center"| ||Ad Abi Karam  ||Bishop of St Maron of Sydney (Maronite) ||align="center" |26 October 2001  ||align="center" |17 April 2013||align="right" | || Retired and appointed Bishop Emeritus of St Maroun of Sydney 
|-
|align="center"| ||Anthony Tarabay, OLM  ||Bishop of St Maron of Sydney (Maronite) ||align="center" |17 April 2013 ||align="center" |present ||align="right" |  ||n/a
|-
|}

See also 

 Roman Catholicism in Australia
 Maronite Church
 List of Catholic dioceses (structured view)
 Christianity in the Middle East

References

External links 
 Maronite Eparchy of Australia
 GigaCatholic, with more episcopal biographies
 Maronite Diocese of Saint Maroun

Lebanese Australian
St. Maron
Roman Catholic dioceses in Australia
Dioceses established in the 20th century
Redfern, New South Wales
Eastern Catholicism in Australia
Asian-Australian culture
Arab-Australian culture
Eastern Catholic dioceses in Oceania